John Keane (19 April 1892 – 24 April 1978) was an Irish hurler. His championship career with the Limerick senior team lasted from 1912 until 1927.

Born in Castleconnell, County Limerick, Keane first played competitive hurling in various club tournament games in his youth. After a year in the United States he returned to Ireland and joined the Castleconnell club. After the club failed to field a championship team in 1918, Keane joined the Young Irelands club. He won county senior championship medals in 1920 and 1922, before ending his career with the newly-founded Ahane club.

Keane made his senior debut for Limerick in a tournament game in 1912 and quickly established himself as a regular member of the team. His partnership with Willie Hough and Dinny Lanigan in the half-back line became known as the Hindenburg Line of hurling. Over the course of a fifteen-year inter-county career he won All-Ireland medals in 1918 and 1921, as well as three Munster medals. Keane retired from inter-county hurling following Limerick's exit from the  1927 championship. 
Keane was also involved as a selector for the Limerick senior team during the 30s, with Limerick winning the championship in 1934 and 1936.

Honours

Young Irelands
Limerick Senior Hurling Championship (2): 1920, 1922

Limerick
All-Ireland Senior Hurling Championship (2): 1918, 1921
Munster Senior Hurling Championship (3): 1918, 1921, 1923

References

1892 births
1978 deaths
Young Irelands (Limerick) hurlers
Ahane hurlers
Limerick inter-county hurlers
All-Ireland Senior Hurling Championship winners